Dave Hemingway (born David Robert Hemingway, 20 September 1960) is an English musician and songwriter, best known as a vocalist for the Hull-based band The Beautiful South until they disbanded in 2007. Previously he had been a member of The Housemartins.

Hemingway was born in Hull, East Riding of Yorkshire, to Harry Hemingway, a lorry driver and local comedian on the club circuit, and Flo Hemingway, who was one of Hull's best-known barmaids. In Hull's Henry Cooper School, Hemingway was in the same class as The Housemartins' future drummer, Hugh Whitaker. The two shared an interest in drumming, and one day, when the class were asked who would like to learn drums, they put their hands up first.  Hemingway followed Whitaker into bands, first the Newpolitans with Dave Rotheray on bass, and then the Velvetones. Whilst at university in London, Hemingway was the drummer and a founding member of The Shoppers. It became a well regarded post-punk band (Steve Brain guitar/ lead vocals, Maxine Tarte keyboards/ vocals, Gavin Hearne lead guitar/vocals, Christos Yanni  bass/ vocals).

His break came when he got a call from Rotheray telling him Whitaker had left The Housemartins. Rotheray recommended him to Housemartins guitarist Stan Cullimore, who phoned him. He was working as a purchase ledger clerk at the time for the Crystal Motor Group. Hemingway quit his job on 6 March 1987, and soon found himself in the studio, recording the band's second album, The People Who Grinned Themselves to Death.

After the Housemartins disbanded, he and Housemartins founder Paul Heaton put together The Beautiful South from its ashes, featuring roadie and bassist Sean Welch.

Hemingway's first solo album, Hello Cruel World, was released as a download only on iTunes. The album's title was inspired by Hemingway's experience recording in the capital.

After forming "The South" in 2008, Hemingway along with Alison Wheeler from the Beautiful South line-up, released their first album since 2006 entitled Sweet Refrains. The album, featuring songs written by keyboardist Damon Butcher and guitarist Phil Barton, was recorded and released in 2012.

Sunbirds
After leaving The South in 2017, Hemingway formed a new band called Sunbirds with former bandmate Phil Barton, drummer Marc Parnell and vocalist Laura Wilcockson. In 2020, Nectar Records released the first single by Sunbirds. Titled "Meet You on the Northside", the song is from the band's debut album, Cool to Be Kind.

References

Bibliography
Pattenden, Michael (1999) Last Orders at the Liars Bar. 

1960 births
Living people
English male singers
English rock singers
English songwriters
English pop rock singers
Musicians from Kingston upon Hull
The Housemartins members
English rock drummers
British male songwriters